Raveni is a village in Thesprotia, Greece. The village is situated on the right bank of the river Thyamis, which flows into the Ionian Sea near Sagiada. It was the ancient city of Phanote, part of the kingdom of Thesprotia. It lies in the foothills of the mountain of Mourgana, where many battles of the Greek civil war took place after the Second World War. Raveni is part of the municipality of Filiates. In 2011 its population was 123. Raveni is 16 km northeast of Filiates town, 26 km northeast of Igoumenitsa and 32 km west of Ioannina.

Population

See also

List of settlements in Thesprotia

External links
Raveni at the GTP Travel Pages

References

Populated places in Thesprotia